The kikau or western wattled honeyeater (Foulehaio procerior) is a species of bird in the honeyeater family Meliphagidae. It was considered conspecific with the Fiji wattled honeyeater and the Polynesian wattled honeyeater.

The species is endemic to Fiji.
Its natural habitats are tropical moist lowland forests, tropical mangrove forests, and tropical moist montane forest.

References

Foulehaio
Endemic birds of Fiji
Birds described in 1867